The 1995 Goody's 500 was the 26th stock car race of the 1995 NASCAR Winston Cup Series and the 47th iteration of the event. The race was held on Sunday, April 23, 1995, in Martinsville, Virginia at Martinsville Speedway, a  permanent oval-shaped short track. The race took the scheduled 500 laps to complete. In the final laps of the race, Richard Childress Racing driver Dale Earnhardt would make a late race pass on Penske Racing South driver Rusty Wallace with eight to go to take his 67th career NASCAR Winston Cup Series victory and his fourth victory of the season, while in the process cutting down his points deficit down to 275 points with points leader Jeff Gordon. To fill out the top three, Hendrick Motorsports driver Terry Labonte and the aforementioned Wallace would finish second and third, respectively.

Background 

Martinsville Speedway is an NASCAR-owned stock car racing track located in Henry County, in Ridgeway, Virginia, just to the south of Martinsville. At 0.526 miles (0.847 km) in length, it is the shortest track in the NASCAR Cup Series. The track was also one of the first paved oval tracks in NASCAR, being built in 1947 by H. Clay Earles. It is also the only remaining race track that has been on the NASCAR circuit from its beginning in 1948.

Entry list 

 (R) denotes rookie driver.

Qualifying 
Two round of qualifying were scheduled to be held on Friday, September 22, and Saturday, September 23. However, Friday's sessions were cancelled due to rain, with both rounds then scheduled to commence on Saturday. However, Saturday's sessions would also be cancelled due to rain, leaving qualifying to be determined by a system of owner's points and postmarks on entry list blanks. The top 30 positions would be determined by the current 1995 owner's points, while the final six spots would be determined by a system of provisionals that included past winners, and finally postmarks. As a result, Hendrick Motorsports driver Jeff Gordon would win the pole.

Six drivers would fail to qualify.

Full qualifying results

Race results

References 

1995 NASCAR Winston Cup Series
NASCAR races at Martinsville Speedway
September 1995 sports events in the United States
1995 in sports in Virginia